The 2019 Supercopa Argentina Final was the 8th edition of the Supercopa Argentina, an annual football match contested by the winners of the Argentine Primera División and Copa Argentina competitions. The match was played at the Estadio Único Madre de Ciudades in Santiago del Estero on 4 March 2021.

Racing and River Plate qualified after winning the 2018–19 Argentine Primera División tournament and the 2018–19 Copa Argentina, respectively.

The match ended in a 5–0 win for River Plate and they won the Supercopa Argentina for the second time in their history.

Qualified teams

Match

Details

Statistics

References 

2020 in Argentine football
2019
Racing Club matches
Supercopa Argentina 2019